Hamsey Green is a place on the plateau of the English North Downs between the villages of Sanderstead to the north and Warlingham to the south. It is split almost across the centre into north and south so is in part in the Tandridge district of Surrey and in part in the London Borough of Croydon.

Geography and amenities
The settlement is a quasi-village which technically does not quite meet village status because of a longstanding dependency on Sanderstead. It stretches along the B269 Limpsfield Road with typical suburban houses and a relatively large parade with several restaurants, convenience stores and other shops. The northern border of the village with Sanderstead is Wentworth Way, which marks the edge of the former Hamsey Green Farm estate that was sold off for housing in the 1920s. The Good Companions, a large pub on the corner with Tithepit Shaw Lane, on the Croydon side of the border, was demolished in December 2012; to the south in Surrey, Hamsey Green is mainly residential with a primary and a secondary school.  Within Hamsey Green, part of the larger parish of Sanderstead, is St Antony's (C of E) church.

A pond by the east side of the Limpsfield Road is believed to date from Neolithic times. It has been recorded since the 13th century, and was mentioned in the Elizabethan Manor Rolls for Sanderstead Manor, when it was referred to as "Wychemere". It is thought to have been a watering hole for cattle. Suburban development in the 1930s reduced the size of the pond; it  is now maintained by Croydon Council and local volunteers.
 
There are important open spaces on either side of Hamsey Green: to the east is King's Wood; to the west is Riddlesdown. The London LOOP path around London passes through on the route between West Wickham Common and Coulsdon.

History

Hamsey Green has never had a manor and the two manors to the north and south were owned by the Atwood Family, who lived at Sanderstead Court. The church was built in 1957 and is part of Sanderstead parish.

Since the closure of the Good Companions, there are no pubs in Hamsey Green owing to the fact that nearby Sanderstead has none, due to the abstentionist Lord of the manor in the early 19th century having imposed conditions on the sale of land to prevent the building of pubs. The nearest public houses are in Warlingham Green and Whyteleafe.
The Good Companions site is currently derelict and owned by Lidl who propose to build a supermarket.

Nearest places
Sanderstead
Warlingham
Kenley
Farleigh

Nearby stations

Whyteleafe railway station
Upper Warlingham station
Riddlesdown station
Whyteleafe South station

References

External links

 Sanderstead Parish Online – Church of England Parish for Sanderstead, Hamsey Green and Riddlesdown

Districts of the London Borough of Croydon
Hamlets in Surrey